, also known as Abe Ani, is a Japanese mixed martial artist currently fighting in the featherweight division for Shooto as well as teaching at his gym, Abe Ani Combat Club. Abe is most notable for training female mixed martial arts veteran and Bellator Fighting Championships finalist, Megumi Fujii.

Abe has fought in many high-level MMA organizations, including Shooto, Pride FC, Deep, King of the Cage and Cage Rage. He has also competed at ADCC. He holds notable bouts against UFC standouts Urijah Faber and Brad Pickett, as well as Pride veteran Luiz Firmino.

He made his return to Shooto after 5 years on September 30, 2012 vs. Shigeki Osawa. He lost the bout via TKO.

Mixed martial arts record

|-
| Loss
| align=center| 8–15–3 (1)
| Shigeki Osawa
| TKO (punches)
| Shooto: 10th Round
| 
| align=center| 1
| align=center| 4:12
| Tokyo, Japan
| 
|-
| Win
| align=center| 8–14–3 (1)
| Atsuhiro Tsuboi
| Decision (unanimous)
| Deep: Cage Impact 2011 in Nagoya
| 
| align=center| 2
| align=center| 5:00
| Nagoya, Japan
| 
|-
| Loss
| align=center| 7–14–3 (1)
| Artiom Damkovsky
| Decision (unanimous)
| Bushido FC: Legends
| 
| align=center| 2
| align=center| 5:00
| St. Petersburg, Russia
| 
|-
| Loss
| align=center| 7–13–3 (1)
| Masakazu Imanari
| Submission (toe hold)
| Deep: 32 Impact
| 
| align=center| 3
| align=center| 4:32
| Tokyo, Japan
| 
|-
| Loss
| align=center| 7–12–3 (1)
| Sami Aziz
| KO (punches)
| Bodog Fight: Vancouver
| 
| align=center| 1
| align=center| 2:31
| Vancouver, British Columbia, Canada
| 
|-
| Loss
| align=center| 7–11–3 (1)
| Takeshi Inoue
| KO (punch)
| Shooto: Back To Our Roots 1
| 
| align=center| 1
| align=center| 4:05
| Yokohama, Japan
| 
|-
| Draw
| align=center| 7–10–3 (1)
| Naoki Matsushita
| Draw
| Pride - Bushido 12
| 
| align=center| 2
| align=center| 5:00
| Nagoya, Japan
| 
|-
| Loss
| align=center| 7–10–2 (1)
| Fabricio Monteiro
| Submission (toe hold)
| Deep: clubDeep Tokyo
| 
| align=center| 2
| align=center| 1:53
| Tokyo, Japan
| 
|-
| Win
| align=center| 7–9–2 (1)
| David Padilla
| Submission (armbar)
| Shooto: The Devilock
| 
| align=center| 1
| align=center| 3:15
| Tokyo, Japan
| 
|-
| Loss
| align=center| 6–9–2 (1)
| Brad Pickett
| Decision (unanimous)
| Cage Rage 16
| 
| align=center| 3
| align=center| 5:00
| London, England
| 
|-
| Loss
| align=center| 6–8–2 (1)
| Tenkei Oda
| Decision (unanimous)
| Shooto: The Victory of the Truth
| 
| align=center| 3
| align=center| 5:00
| Tokyo, Japan
| 
|-
| Win
| align=center| 6–7–2 (1)
| Joey Brown
| Submission (heel hook)
| Euphoria: USA vs. Japan
| 
| align=center| 1
| align=center| 1:40
| Atlantic City, New Jersey, United States
| 
|-
| Loss
| align=center| 5–7–2 (1)
| Urijah Faber
| TKO (cut)
| KOTC: Mortal Sins
| 
| align=center| 3
| align=center| 2:37
| Primm, Nevada, United States
| 
|-
| Loss
| align=center| 5–6–2 (1)
| Ryan Schultz
| TKO (punches)
| Euphoria: USA vs. World
| 
| align=center| 2
| align=center| 0:42
| Atlantic City, New Jersey, United States
| 
|-
| Loss
| align=center| 5–5–2 (1)
| Makoto Ishikawa
| TKO (cut)
| Shooto: Year End Show 2004
| 
| align=center| 3
| align=center| 0:40
| Tokyo, Japan
| 
|-
| NC
| align=center| 5–4–2 (1)
| Russ Miura
| No Contest
| KOTC 44: Revenge
| 
| align=center| 1
| align=center| 2:29
| San Jacinto, California, United States
| 
|-
| Loss
| align=center| 5–4–2
| Luiz Firmino
| Submission (arm-triangle choke)
| Pride Bushido 4
| 
| align=center| 1
| align=center| 2:52
| Nagoya, Japan
| 
|-
| Loss
| align=center| 5–3–2
| João Roque
| Submission (armbar)
| Shooto: Gig Central 4
| 
| align=center| 2
| align=center| 4:59
| Nagoya, Japan
| 
|-
| Loss
| align=center| 5–2–2
| Alexandre Franca Nogueira
| Submission (rear-naked choke)
| Shooto: Year End Show 2002
| 
| align=center| 1
| align=center| 3:53
| Urayasu, Japan
| 
|-
| Win
| align=center| 5–1–2
| Alexandre Franca Nogueira
| KO (punch)
| Shooto: Treasure Hunt 8
| 
| align=center| 1
| align=center| 4:37
| Tokyo, Japan
| 
|-
| Draw
| align=center| 4–1–2
| Baret Yoshida
| Draw
| Shooto: Treasure Hunt 5
| 
| align=center| 3
| align=center| 5:00
| Tokyo, Japan
| 
|-
| Win
| align=center| 4–1–1
| Kazuhiro Inoue
| TKO (doctor stoppage)
| Shooto: To The Top 10
| 
| align=center| 1
| align=center| 4:00
| Tokyo, Japan
| 
|-
| Loss
| align=center| 3–1–1
| Stephen Palling
| KO (punches)
| Shooto: R.E.A.D. 10
| 
| align=center| 2
| align=center| 2:23
| Tokyo, Japan
| 
|-
| Win
| align=center| 3–0–1
| Kimihito Nonaka
| Decision (unanimous)
| Shooto: R.E.A.D. 5
| 
| align=center| 2
| align=center| 5:00
| Tokyo, Japan
| 
|-
| Draw
| align=center| 2–0–1
| Masahiro Oishi
| Draw
| Shooto: Renaxis 4
| 
| align=center| 2
| align=center| 5:00
| Tokyo, Japan
| 
|-
| Win
| align=center| 2–0
| Yoshiyuki Takayama
| Decision (unanimous)
| Shooto: 10th Anniversary Event
| 
| align=center| 2
| align=center| 5:00
| Yokohama, Japan
| 
|-
| Win
| align=center| 1–0
| Andrew Kerr
| Submission (armbar)
| Greatest Common Multiple Vale Tudo
| 
| align=center| 2
| align=center| 2:22
| Japan
|

References

External links
 Sherdog.com 
 AACC

1970 births
Living people
Japanese male mixed martial artists
Featherweight mixed martial artists
Japanese male kickboxers
Lightweight kickboxers
Japanese practitioners of Brazilian jiu-jitsu
People awarded a black belt in Brazilian jiu-jitsu
Japanese male judoka
Japanese male karateka
Japanese sambo practitioners
Mixed martial artists utilizing judo
Mixed martial artists utilizing karate
Mixed martial artists utilizing sambo
Mixed martial artists utilizing catch wrestling
Mixed martial artists utilizing shootfighting
Mixed martial artists utilizing Brazilian jiu-jitsu
Mixed martial arts trainers
Brazilian jiu-jitsu trainers
People from Aichi Prefecture
Sportspeople from Aichi Prefecture